Satyadeo Ram (alternatively Satyadev Ram; born 2 February 1964) is an Indian politician and member of Bihar Legislative Assembly. In the Bihar Legislative Assembly Election, 2015, he was elected from Darauli constituency, by defeating Ramayan Manjhi (BJP), a two time MLA, by a margin of about 10,000 votes. He is one of the prominent leaders of Communist Party of India (Marxist–Leninist) (Liberation) from Siwan district, others being former MLA Amarnath Yadav and Amarjeet Kushwaha.

Early life  
Satyadev Ram was born in Krishnapali village of Darauli Block of Siwan district of Bihar in a Dalit family. His father, the late Rajbanshi Ram, was a farmer. He graduated from 'Shyam Lal Jain Uchha Vidyalaya, Darauli' in 1982. He worked as an agriculturist and social worker.

Career 
He joined the Communist Party of India (Marxist–Leninist) (Liberation).

He contested from Gopalganj constituency in the 2009 Indian general election but was defeated.

Personal life 
He married Malti Devi, another social worker and a political leader and Mukhiya of her Gram Panchayat. The couple has a daughter, Gudiya and two sons, Chandrashekhar and Chhotu.

References

External links 

Living people
Communist Party of India (Marxist–Leninist) Liberation politicians
Bihar MLAs 2015–2020
1964 births